Charaxes macclounii, the wild-bamboo charaxes or red coast charaxes, is a butterfly in the family Nymphalidae. It is found along the coast of Kenya, as well as in Tanzania, the Democratic Republic of the Congo, north-eastern Angola, Burundi, Zambia, Malawi, Mozambique and eastern and northern Zimbabwe.

Description
Expanse  of  wings  80  millim.
female  . Extremely  like  Mr.  Trimen's  figure  of  C.  lasti  female (P.  Z.  S. 1894,  pi. Expanse  of  wings  18  millim.
Two  pairs,  Zomba.
This  species  is  intermediate  in  character  between  C.  lasti  and C  cynthia.
 

Close to Charaxes lasti but underside much paler and with a less distinct silvery band border

Biology
The habitat consists of dense savanna and open forests.

The larvae feed on Oxytenanthera abyssinica, Oreobambos buchwaldii, Bambusa vulgaris, Yushania alpina and Arundinaria species. Young larvae spin a cushion of silk. They are green and reach a length of 45–50 mm when fully grown.

Taxonomy
Related to Charaxes lasti, Charaxes cynthia and Charaxes boueti

References

External links
Charaxes macclounii images at Consortium for the Barcode of Life
Images of C. macclouni Royal Museum for Central Africa (Albertine Rift Project)

Butterflies described in 1895
macclounii
Butterflies of Africa